Anna Laszuk (9 November 1969 – 12 October 2012) was a Polish radio journalist, columnist and lesbian movement activist.

From 2000 Laszuk worked for Radio TOK FM, and became lead for the radio program Komentarze. Laszuk was the chief editor for Furia, a Polish feminist-lesbian irregular magazine. In addition to this, she also directed an amateur theatre group and led sociotherapeutic activities for children.

She died of cancer on 12 October 2012. She is buried in the Northern Communal Cemetery.

TOK FM established the annual award Anny Laszuk from 2013, given for "courageous, unconventional, unusual activities, work or expression, which had a significant impact on public awareness and change to Polish life."

Publications

References 

1969 births
2012 deaths
Polish LGBT journalists
Polish LGBT rights activists
Polish lesbian writers
Lesbian journalists
Polish radio journalists
Writers from Warsaw
Women radio journalists
Deaths from cancer in Poland
21st-century Polish LGBT people